Sunil Kumar Lala is an Indian politician and a member of the 16th Legislative Assembly in India. He represents the Kasta constituency of Uttar Pradesh and is a member of the Samajwadi Party political party.

Early life and  education
Sunil Kumar Lala was born in Lakhimpur Kheri district. He attended the Adarsh Inter College and is educated till eighth grade.

Political career
Sunil Kumar Lala has been a MLA for one term. He represented the Kasta constituency and is a member of the Samajwadi Party political party.

He lost his seat in the 2017 Uttar Pradesh Assembly election to Saurabh Singh of the Bharatiya Janata Party.

Posts held

See also
 Kasta (Assembly constituency)
 Sixteenth Legislative Assembly of Uttar Pradesh
 Uttar Pradesh Legislative Assembly

References 

1980 births
Living people
People from Lakhimpur Kheri district
Samajwadi Party politicians
Uttar Pradesh MLAs 2012–2017